Woodfjord is a fjord on the north shore of Spitsbergen island in the Svalbard archipelago. It is the  fourth longest fjord in the Svalbard archipelago with the mouth facing north adjacent to Wijdefjord, and goes  into the island, west of Andrée Land.

External links
 A detailed map of Svalbard with Woodfjord labeled
 Norwegian Polar Institute
 Public Institutions and Services in Svalbard
 The Svalbard Project
 Svalbard Info
 Svalbard Images Photos

References

Fjords of Spitsbergen